The Ulur mine is one of the largest graphite mines in Russia and in the world. The mine is located in the east of the country in Sakha Republic. The mine has estimated reserves of 10 million tonnes of ore 30% graphite.

References 

Graphite mines in Russia